Lavrean is a hamlet in the parish of Luxulyan, Cornwall, England. It is in the civil parish of Treverbyn

References

Hamlets in Cornwall